Algeria and Italy have a connection. Northern part of Algeria's today was formerly territory of the Roman Empire which was originally from modern-day Italy, some historical sites like the Djémila and Tipasa, two ancient Roman heritages that are now UNESCO World Heritage Sites. Due to historical legacies, Italy and Algeria's relations is viewed as important for stability in the region.

Algeria has an embassy in Rome. Italy has an embassy in Algiers. Two nations are members of the Union for the Mediterranean.

History
After the Roman Empire annexed Carthage, which had also ruled northern Algeria, the Roman administration developed a strong cultural establishment within Algeria, that remains heavily in Algeria today.

During French conquest of Algeria, Italo-French settlers had arrived as part of French colonial domination in Algeria that later formed the Pied-Noirs, and they had developed a significant cultural impact on Algerian society. They were forced to leave upon the independence of Algeria in 1962.

Modern relations
Italy has been a strong supporter for Algeria's stability following a decade of civil conflict in Algeria, and provided intelligence for Algerian Government battling the Islamists.

In 2014, during a visit to Algiers, the Italian Prime Minister Matteo Renzi called the relationship between Italy and Algeria "very important and strategic".

Italy and Algeria have been working to deepen the tie between two states, notably economic and energy cooperations. On 26 May 2022, during a state visit to Rome, Algerian President Abdelmadjid Tebboune agreed to increase gas supply for Italy and Europe after the Russian invasion of Ukraine. On 18 July 2022, Tebboune and Italian Prime Minister Mario Draghi signed an energy contract worth €4 billion for additional gas supply to Italy in Algiers, making Algeria Italy's biggest gas supplier.

Algerian Embassy 
The Algerian embassy is located in Rome.

 Ambassador Touahria Abdelkrim

Italian Embassy 
The Italian embassy is located in Algiers.

 Ambassador Giovanni Pugliese

See also
Foreign relations of Algeria 
Foreign relations of Italy
The Battle of Algiers, 1966 Italo-Algerian movie

References

External links
Embassy of Algeria in Rome 
Embassy of Italy, Algeria 

 
Italy
Bilateral relations of Italy